Sir William Watson Rutherford, 1st Baronet (1853 – 3 December 1927) was a Conservative party politician in the United Kingdom who was Member of Parliament and Lord Mayor of Liverpool.

Rutherford was from Liverpool, where he was head of a leading legal firm. He was elected to the City Council in 1895.

Rutherford was an unsuccessful candidate in the 1900 general election for the Liverpool Scotland constituency. He was elected Lord Mayor of Liverpool in November 1902, but resigned in early January 1903 to be the candidate in a by-election for parliament.  After he was elected to parliament on 20 January 1903, he was also re-elected as mayor on 4 February 1903 and served the remainder of the term until November 1903. He was the Member of Parliament (MP) for Liverpool West Derby from the January 1903 by-election until 1918, and for Liverpool Edge Hill from 1918 to 1923.

He was knighted in the 1918 New Year Honours and made a baronet on 24 July 1923. He developed the Rutherford Code for transmitting chess moves over a telegraph.

He was a key member of Liverpool Chess Club

References

External links 
 

1853 births
1927 deaths
Baronets in the Baronetage of the United Kingdom
Conservative Party (UK) MPs for English constituencies
Knights Bachelor
UK MPs 1900–1906
UK MPs 1906–1910
UK MPs 1910
UK MPs 1910–1918
UK MPs 1918–1922
UK MPs 1922–1923
Mayors of Liverpool